Eucalyptus alipes, also known as Hyden mallet, is a mallet that is endemic to the south-west of Western Australia. It has smooth grey to light brown or bronze bark, linear to narrow elliptic leaves, oval to spindle-shaped buds with a long, narrow operculum and conical fruits.

Description 
It has smooth grey to light brown or bronze bark. The operculum is cylindrical to hemispherical, up to twice as long as the flower cup but narrower than it at the join. Flowering occurs from December or January to February and the flowers are creamy white.

Taxonomy and naming
This eucalypt was first formally described in 1992 by Ken Hill and Lawrie Johnson and given the name Eucalyptus suggrandis subsp. alipes. In 2005, Dean Nicolle and Ian Brooker raised the subspecies to species status as Eucalyptus alipes. The specific epithet (alipes) is a Latin word meaning "wing-footed" referring to the pedicels.

Distribution and habitat
Eucalyptus alipes often grows in pure stands in saline soils and along saline drainage lines and is found between Hyden, Coolgardie, and Norseman as well as south to Lake King and west to Narembeen.

Conservation
Eucalyptus alipes is classified as "not threatened" by the Western Australian Government Department of Parks and Wildlife.

See also
List of Eucalyptus species

References

alipes
Myrtales of Australia
Eucalypts of Western Australia
Plants described in 1992
Taxa named by Lawrence Alexander Sidney Johnson
Taxa named by Ken Hill (botanist)